The Guadalcanal Campaign, called Operation Watchtower, was the first major Allied offensive in the Pacific Theater of Operations in World War II. The campaign lasted from the initial American landings on 7 August 1942 until the final Japanese evacuation on 9 February 1943, a period of six months, far longer than was expected by Allied planners. 

The initial 7 August landings on Guadalcanal itself and Tulagi across Savo Sound (the site of a Japanese seaplane base) were carried out by US Marines under the command of Major General Alexander A. Vandegrift. In recognition of his courage and extraordinary leadership during the Corps's four-month struggle, he was awarded the Congressional Medal of Honor the following year. 

Forces of the US Army began arriving to relieve the exhausted Marines on 13 October. On 8 December Vandegrift was replaced by Major General Alexander M. Patch, US Army, who was named commander of the XIV Army Corps on 2 January 1943. Patch declared the island secure on 9 February.

The 1st Marine Division's struggle to take Guadalcanal from the Imperial Japanese Army achieved legendary status: the heat and mud, the malaria and dysentery, the giant tropical insects and the fanatical, often suicidal, resistance of the Japanese combined to create an immense amount of sheer suffering. Today, the unit's insignia features the word "Guadalcanal" superimposed on a large red numeral 1. Three future commandants of the Marine Corps fought on "The Canal": Alexander A. Vandegrift, Clifton B. Cates and Lemuel C. Shepherd.

 Why does the mere mention of the southwest Pacific cause the men who fought there to shudder? Why does so genteel an author as Herman Wouk, whipped into a white-lipped rage at the mere thought of Guadalcanal, write that it "was and remains 'that fucking island'"? Why was combat there considered — correctly – worse than Stalingrad?William Manchester, Goodbye, Darkness: A Memoir of the Pacific War (1980), p. 79

In addition to the action on the ground, the United States Navy and Imperial Japanese Navy fought several vicious and costly surface engagements at night in the waters of Savo Sound. Two nights after the initial landings, the US Navy experienced the worst open-water defeat in its history at the Battle of Savo Island. By the time the Japanese had given up on Guadalcanal, they had lost 2 battleships, 2 heavy cruisers and 7 destroyers; Allied losses included 5 heavy cruisers (one of which was Australian), 2 light cruisers and a destroyer. Each side had an admiral killed in combat. After the war, the area was renamed Ironbottom Sound in reference to the number of ships sunk there.

United States

Theater command 

The roles of Commander in Chief, Pacific Ocean Areas (CINCPOA) and Commander in Chief, U.S. Pacific Fleet (CINCPAC), were both exercised by Admiral Chester W. Nimitz from his headquarters at Pearl Harbor, Hawaii.

Since the Solomons lie in the Southern Pacific, the landings of 7 August 1942 on Guadalcanal were the responsibility of the South Pacific Fleet, led by Vice Admiral Robert L. Ghormley from his headquarters at Nouméa, New Caledonia. Adm. Ghormley's pessimism, inadequate staff work and unwillingness to visit the front led Adm. Nimitz to replace him with the much more aggressive and hands-on Vice Admiral William F. Halsey on 18 October 1942.

Operational command 

Operational command of the invasion was assigned to Vice Admiral Frank Jack Fletcher. He also had direct command of the covering force, designated Task Force 61, where he flew his flag aboard fleet carrier Saratoga. The amphibious forces, Task Force 62, were led by Rear Admiral Richmond Kelly Turner aboard attack transport McCawley.

Bitter disputes between Vice Adm. Fletcher and Rear Adm. Turner arose during both the planning and execution of the invasion. At issue was how long Fletcher's aircraft carriers would stay in the vicinity of Guadalcanal to provide air cover for Turner's support vessels in Savo Sound. The matter came to a head on D+1 (8 August), after two days of assaults by bombers from the Japanese base at Rabaul. These attacks convinced Fletcher that his crucial aircraft carriers could not be risked in the waters of the Solomons any longer and his task force departed the area that evening. Unsettled by the removal of air cover and rattled on the morning of D+2 by the discovery that his cruiser screen had been decimated at the Battle of Savo Island, Turner ordered his vulnerable, and still half-full, cargo ships back to Nouméa around sundown 9 August. The Marine Corps forces ashore were thus left without air cover or the planned level of food and ammunition. This suboptimal outcome was at least partially attributable to the decision to vest both overall mission command and carrier task force command in the same individual (Vice Adm. Fletcher).

Marine forces 

The D-Day (7 August) landings on Guadalcanal were carried out by the 1st and 3rd Battalions/5th Marines at 0910 hours, followed by the 1st Marines at 0930. Landings on the Florida Islands across Savo Sound were carried out earlier that morning by the 2nd Battalion/5th Marines, the 1st Parachute Battalion, and the 1st Marine Raider Battalion. The 7th Marines and 1st Battalion/11th Marines arrived 18 September. The division began withdrawal from the island 12 December.

 1st Marine Division
Major General Alexander A. Vandegrift
Asst. Div. Cmdr.: Brigadier General William H. Rupertus

 Division staff
 Chief of staff: Col. William C. James (to 24 Sep); Col. Gerald C. Thomas
 Asst. CoS for Personnel (D-1): Col. Robert C. Kilmartin Jr.
 Asst. CoS for Intelligence (D-2): Lt. Col. Frank B. Goettge (to 12 Aug); Lt. Col. Edmund J. Buckley
 Asst. CoS for Operations (D-3): Lt. Col. Gerald C. Thomas (to 24 Sep); Lt. Col. Merrill B. Twining
 Asst. CoS for Logistics (D-4): Lt. Col. Randolph M. Pate

  1st Marine Regiment
 Colonel Clifton B. Cates
 Exec. ofc.: Lt. Col. Julian N. Frisbie (to 23 Sep); Lt. Col. Edwin A. Pollock
 1st Battalion: Lt. Col. Leonard B. Cresswell
 2nd Battalion: Lt. Col. Edwin A. Pollock (to 23 Sep); Lt. Col. William W. Stickney
 3rd Battalion: Lt. Col. William N. McKelvy Jr.

  5th Marine Regiment
 Colonel Leroy P. Hunt (to 21 Sep) ; Colonel Merritt A. Edson
 Exec. ofc.: Col. William J. Whaling (to 25 Sep); Lt. Col. Walker A. Reaves (to 12 Oct); Lt. Col. William S. Fellers
 1st Battalion: Lt. Col. William E. Maxwell (to 30 Aug); Maj. Donald W. Fuller (to 13 Oct); Maj. William K. Enright
 2nd Battalion: Lt. Col. Harold E. Rosecrans (to 11 Sep); Capt. Joseph J. Dudkowski (1-17, 25-30 Sep); Lt. Col. Walker A. Reaves (18-24 Sep); Maj. David S. McDougal (1-8 Oct); Maj. William J. Piper (8-11 Oct); Maj. Lewis W. Walt
 3rd Battalion: Lt. Col. Frederick C. Biebush (to 22 Sep); Maj. Robert O. Bowen

  7th Marine Regiment
 Colonel James W. Webb (to 20 Sep); Colonel Amor L. Sims
 Exec. ofc.: Col. Amor L. Sims (to 20 Sep); Lt. Col. Julian N. Frisbie
 1st Battalion: Lt. Col. Lewis B. "Chesty" Puller
 2nd Battalion: Lt. Col. Herman H. "Hard-Headed" Hanneken
 3rd Battalion: Lt. Col. Edwin J. Farrell (to 24 Sep); Lt. Col. William R. Williams

  11th Marine Regiment (Artillery)
 Colonel Pedro del Valle
 Exec. ofc.: Lt. Col. John A. Bemis (to 17 Oct); Lt. Col. Robert B. Luckey (to 28 Nov); Lt. Col. Thomas B. Hughes
 1st Battalion: Lt. Col. Joseph R. Knowlan (to 19 Oct); Lt. Col. Manley L. Curry (to 28 Nov); Lt. Col. Donovan D. Sult (to 2 Dec)
 2nd Battalion: Lt. Col. Edward G. Hagen (to 14 Sep); Maj. Forest C. Thompson
 3rd Battalion: Lt. Col. James J. Keating
 4th Battalion: Lt. Col. Melvin E. Fuller (to 28 Oct; from 7 Dec); Maj. Carl G.F. Korn (28-31 Oct); Capt. Albert H. Potter (to 6 Dec)
 5th Battalion: Lt. Col. E. Hayden Price (to 18 Oct); Maj. Noah P. Wood, Jr. 

 Other Marine units
 3rd Defense Battalion (landed 7 Aug): Col. Robert H. Pepper
 Executive officer: Lt. Col. Harold C. Roberts
 Operations officer: Maj. Samuel G. Taxis
 1st Parachute Battalion: Maj. Charles A. Miller (to 18 Sep); Capt. Harry Torgerson (19-26 Sep); Maj. Robert H. Williams (from 27 Sep)
 1st Raider Battalion: Col. Merritt A. Edson (to 21 Sep); Lt. Col. Samuel B. Griffith (22-27 Sep)
 1st Amphibian Tractor Battalion: Lt. Col. Walter W. Barr
 1st Aviation Engineer Battalion: Maj. Thomas F. Riley
 1st Pioneer Battalion: Maj. James G. Frazer (to 25 Oct); Maj. Henry H. Crockett
 1st Medical Battalion: Cmdr. Don S. Knowlton, USN 
 1st Special Weapons Battalion: Maj. Robert B. Luckey (to 6 Oct); Maj. Richard W. Wallace
 1st Tank Battalion: Maj. Harvey S. Walseth

 2nd Marine Division
Brigadier General Alphonse DeCarre

The 2nd Marines reinforced by the 3rd Battalion/10th Marines were part of the initial 7 August landings. The reinforced 8th Marines landed on 2 November and the reinforced 6th Marines on 4 January 1943. 
 Division staff
 Asst. to commanding general: Col. Leo D. Hermle
 Chief of staff: Col. George F. Stockes
 Asst. CoS for Personnel (D-1): Maj. Lawrence C. Hays Jr.
 Asst. CoS for Intelligence (D-2): Maj. Thomas J. Colley
 Asst. CoS for Operations (D-3): Lt. Col. John H. Coffman
 Asst. CoS for Logistics (D-4): Maj. George N. Carroll
 Division special troops: Col. Maurice G. Holmes

  2nd Marine Regiment
 Colonel John M. Arthur
 Exec. ofc.: Lt. Col. William S. Fellers (to 9 Oct); Lt. Col. Cornelius P. Van Ness
 1st Battalion: Lt. Col. Robert E. Hill (to 10 Nov); Maj. Wood B. Kyle
 2nd Battalion: Maj. Orin K. Pressley
 3rd Battalion: Maj. Robert G. Hunt

  6th Marine Regiment
 Colonel Gilder D. Jackson Jr.
 Exec. ofc.: Lt. Col. Alfred A. Watters (to 15 Dec); Lt. Col. Lyman G. Miller
 1st Battalion: Lt. Col. Russell Lloyd
 2nd Battalion: Maj. Raymond L. Murray
 3rd Battalion: Maj. William A. Kengla

  8th Marine Regiment
 Colonel Richard H. Jeschke
 Exec. ofc.: Lt. Col. James P. Riseley
 1st Battalion: Lt. Col. Miles S. Newton (from 15 Jan. to 15 Nov, 1942); Maj. Joseph B. McCaffery
 2nd Battalion: Lt. Col. John H. Cook Jr.
 3rd Battalion: Lt. Col. Augustus H. Fricke

  10th Marine Regiment (Artillery)
 Colonel Thomas E. Bourke
 Exec. ofc.: Lt. Col. Ralph E. Forsyth
 1st Battalion: Lt. Col. Presley M. Rixey
 2nd Battalion: Maj. George R. E. Shell
 3rd Battalion: Lt. Col. Manly L. Curry (to 18 Oct; from 28 Nov); Lt. Col. Donovan D. Sult (18 Oct-28 Nov)
 4th Battalion: Lt. Col. Kenneth A. Jorgensen

 Other Marine units
 2nd Amphibian Tractor Battalion: Maj. Henry C. Drewes
 9th Defense Battalion (landed December 1942)
 Commanding officer: Col. David R. Nimmer
 Executive officer: Lt. Col. William J. Scheyer
 Operations officer: Capt. William C. Givens
 2nd Raider Battalion ("Carlson's Raiders"): Lt. Col. Evans F. Carlson
 2nd Special Weapons Battalion: Lt. Col. Paul D. Sherman
 2nd Tank Battalion: Maj. Alexander B. Swenceski
6th Naval Construction Battalion: Lt. Cmdr. Joseph L. Blundon, CEC (Started landing on 27 August)
3rd Battalion 18th Marines (started landing on 12 December)

Army forces 

 Americal Division

Major General Alexander M. Patch
 Arrived in echelons beginning 13 October:
 132nd Infantry Regiment (Illinois National Guard)
 164th Infantry Regiment (North Dakota National Guard)
 Landed 13 October:
 182nd Infantry Regiment (Massachusetts National Guard)
 Landed 12 November:
 147th Infantry Regiment (Separate) (Ohio National Guard)
 97th Field Artillery Battalion
 214th Coast Artillery (United States)
 244th Coast Artillery Regiment
 221st Field Artillery Battalion
 245th Field Artillery Battalion
 246th Field Artillery Battalion
 247th Field Artillery Battalion
 57th Engineer Combat Battalion

 25th Infantry Division

Major General J. Lawton Collins
 Arrived in echelons beginning 17 December:
 27th Infantry Regiment
 35th Infantry Regiment
 161st Infantry Regiment (Washington National Guard)
 Battalion-level units:
 8th Field Artillery Battalion
 64th Field Artillery Battalion
 89th Field Artillery Battalion
 90th Field Artillery Battalion
 65th Engineer Combat Battalion

Service Command, South Pacific Theater of Operations
Brigadier General Raymond E. S. Williamson
 70th Coast Artillery
 Engineer units
 Supply units
 Military Police units

Japanese

Seventeenth Army 
Lieutenant General Harukichi Hyakutake

2nd Infantry (Sendai) Division
Lieutenant General Masao Maruyama
 Landed between 5 September and 4 October:
 4th Infantry Regiment
 16th Infantry Regiment
 29th Infantry Regiment
 2nd Artillery Regiment
 2nd Engineer Battalion

38th Infantry Division
Lieutenant General Tadayoshi Sano
 The depleted 38th Division landed 5–15 November
 228th Infantry Regiment
 229th Infantry Regiment
 230th Infantry Regiment
 38th Mountain Gun Regiment
 38th Engineer Battalion

35th Brigade
Major General Kiyotaki Kawaguchi
 Landed 29 August–5 September; included a late-arriving battalion of the 28th Infantry Regiment.
 124th Infantry Regiment
 Kitao Battalion / Ichiki Detachment
 4th Artillery Regiment
 10th Mountain Gun Battalion
 20th Mountain Gun Battalion

Other units 
 28th Infantry Regiment
 Arrived 6 July to begin construction of an airstrip:
 11th Construction Unit
 13th Construction Unit

Notes

References

Bibliography 

World War II orders of battle